Julia jubilerar is a 1938 Swedish-Danish comedy film directed by Lau Lauritzen Jr. and Alice O'Fredericks.

Cast
 Katie Rolfsen as Julia Lundkvist
 Thor Modéen as Mårten Lagergren, piano tuner
 Annalisa Ericson as Greta Ahlbom
 Lau Lauritzen, Jr. as Erik Kruse
 Åke Söderblom as Åke Jansson
 Oscar Törnblom as Oscar Hansson
 Eric Gustafson as Manager
 Nils Nordståhl as Secretary
 Hilding Rolin as Hallberg 'Professor'
 Claes Thelander as Hallberg 'Doctor'
 John Degerberg as Receptionist
 George Thunstedt as Porter
 Harald Svensson as Svensson, senior accountant

See also
Winter Night's Dream (1935)
Frk. Møllers jubilæum (1937)

References

External links

1938 films
1938 comedy films
1930s Swedish-language films
Swedish black-and-white films
Films directed by Lau Lauritzen Jr.
Films directed by Alice O'Fredericks
Danish comedy films
Danish black-and-white films
Swedish comedy films
Remakes of German films
1930s Swedish films